The 2022 Northwestern Wildcats football team represented Northwestern University during the 2022 NCAA Division I FBS football season. The Wildcats played their home games at Ryan Field in Evanston, Illinois, and competed as members of the Big Ten Conference. They were led by 17th-year head coach Pat Fitzgerald.

Schedule
Northwestern announced its 2022 football schedule on January 12, 2022. The 2022 schedule consisted of six home games and five away games, as well as a neutral-site game in the regular season. The Wildcats hosted Big Ten foes Wisconsin, Ohio State, and Illinois and traveled to Penn State, Maryland, Iowa, Minnesota, and Purdue. They played Nebraska at Aviva Stadium in Dublin, Ireland. The Wildcats hosted all three non-conference opponents, Duke from the ACC, Southern Illinois from Division I FCS, and Miami (OH) from the MAC.

Rankings

Game summaries

Nebraska

Duke

Southern Illinois

Miami (OH)

at No. 11 Penn State

Wisconsin

at Maryland

at Iowa

No. 2 Ohio State

at Minnesota

at Purdue

Illinois

References

Northwestern
Northwestern Wildcats football seasons
Northwestern Wildcats football